This article details the Warrington Wolves Rugby League Football Club's 2013 season. This is the club's Eighteenth season of the Super League era. Warrington Lost the Challenge Cup that they held due to a loss in the semi-final against Hull FC. They also made their second successive Grand Final appearance losing a 30-16 against Wigan Warriors in the final.

Pre Season Fixtures

Warrington Wolves played two pre season fixtures. The Wolves faced local rivals Widnes Vikings on Boxing Day and played a team mixed with youth and experience. The Wolves ran out winners by 30-22. In the final pre season fixture the Wolves face rivals Wigan Warriors which was for Ben Westwood Testimonial. The Wolves put out a near full strength team and beat Wigan by 20-0.

2013 Super League Fixtures\Results

Super League XVIII by club
Warrington Wolves seasons